Yael Stone is an Australian actress. She has worked extensively in Australian theatre and has won two Sydney Theatre Awards. On screen, she is best known for her portrayal of Lorna Morello in the Netflix series Orange Is the New Black. Stone is also known for her support of abortion rights and climate protection, and has vocally advocated for women's issues.

Early life and education

Stone was born and raised in Sydney, New South Wales, the daughter of Judy, a nurse, and Harry Stone, an architect. Her father was born in Czechoslovakia, to Holocaust survivor parents. Stone's father is from a Jewish family and her mother, who is of Romanian descent, converted to Judaism. Her brother, Jake Stone, was the lead singer of the band Bluejuice. Her sister, Elana Stone, is also a musician.

Stone attended the Newtown High School of the Performing Arts and the National Institute of Dramatic Art (NIDA).

Career
Stone began acting as a child, with roles in the film Me Myself I and the miniseries The Farm. She worked primarily in theatre; at the 2008 Sydney Theatre Awards, she won the awards for Best Newcomer and Best Supporting Actress for her performance in The Kid. She also worked in television, including supporting roles in All Saints and Spirited. From 2010 to 2011, she appeared in The Diary of a Madman (a theatrical adaptation of the Gogol short story), a role for which she was again nominated for Best Supporting Actress at the Sydney Theatre Awards. In February 2011, she travelled to New York City to perform in the Brooklyn Academy of Music's production of The Diary of a Madman, before returning to lead roles in A Golem Story, Summer of the Seventeenth Doll, and As You Like It in Sydney.

Stone moved to New York permanently in December 2011 and co-founded an experimental theatre company. After four months in New York, she was cast in the Netflix series Orange Is the New Black, a show set in a women's prison. Stone plays Lorna Morello, a prisoner from Boston; her accent, a mixture of Brooklyn and Boston, was called "the most amazing accent on television" by a journalist for The New Republic, while another reviewer deemed the role to be Stone's "breakout turn". She reprised her role in the show's second season, and was billed as a series regular in the third season.

She has also appeared on the HBO and web series High Maintenance.

Personal life
Stone is an atheist.

In 2012, she married Australian actor Dan Spielman, with whom she lived in New York City. In July 2017, Stone announced that her marriage had ended over a year earlier. 

Stone started dating Australian Indigenous Mentoring Experience (AIME) founder Jack Manning Bancroft, and in November 2017 announced they were expecting their first child. On 30 May 2018, their baby girl, Pemau Stone Bancroft, was born. In December 2022, Yael revealed she gave birth to a second child.

On 16 December 2018, The New York Times published an interview with Stone in which she accused Australian actor Geoffrey Rush of sexual misconduct during the production of The Diary of a Madman in 2010 and 2011. She alleged that he had sent her inappropriate texts that were "sexual in nature", had touched her back in an "unwanted and sustained" manner at an awards show, had held a mirror above her shower cubicle while she was showering, and had danced naked in front of her in their dressing room. Rush responded in a statement to the Times through his attorneys, saying that Stone's allegations were "incorrect and in some instances have been taken completely out of context. However, clearly Yael has been upset on occasion by the spirited enthusiasm I generally bring to my work. I sincerely and deeply regret if I have caused her any distress. This, most certainly, has never been my intention."

On 7January 2020, midway through the 2019-2020 Australian bushfire season, Stone announced her intention to give up her United States green card and return to Australia to campaign for climate protection or, as she described it, the "climate war".

Filmography

Films

Television

References

External links

'An Accent Can Tell A Big Story,' Says 'Orange Is The New Black's' Yael Stone (WBUR audio story, including examples of her accent and her influences)

1985 births
20th-century atheists
20th-century Australian actresses
21st-century atheists
21st-century Australian actresses
Actresses from Sydney
Australian activists
Australian atheists
Australian environmentalists
Australian film actresses
Australian people of Czech-Jewish descent
Australian people of Romanian descent
Australian stage actresses
Australian television actresses
Jewish atheists
Jewish Australian actresses
Living people
National Institute of Dramatic Art alumni